Josef "Joža" Karas (May 3, 1926 – November 28, 2008) was a Polish-born, Czech-American musician and teacher who located and made public music composed by inmates who worked at the Nazi concentration camp Theresienstadt during World War II. He was the author of Music in Terezín 1941-1945 (1985).

Musical career
Born to Christian parents in Warsaw, Karas emigrated to the United States in 1948 via Colombia and Canada. A violinist and music historian by vocation, he taught at the Hartt School of Music for more than 50 years. He also performed with the Hartford Symphony Orchestra until his retirement in 2006. He spent years searching for the World War II era musical compositions made by Jews in the Nazi concentration camps.

In 1970 he read that some musical compositions and fragments had been found at the Terezin concentration camp and been donated to Prague's Jewish State Museum, including a version of Hans Krasa's children's opera, Brundibar, which was performed at Terezin many times between September 1943 and October 1944. He conducted the North American premiere of Brundibar in Czech in 1975 and the English language premiere in 1977 after he and his first wife, the former Milada Javora (died 1974), translated the opera into English. In 1993 Channel Classics recorded his version as part of its Composers From Theresienstadt series.

Death
Joža Karas died in Bloomfield, Connecticut on  November 28, 2008, aged 82. He was survived by his second wife (Anne Killackey Karas), six children (Francis, Henry, Michael, Joseph, Alexander, and Joan K. Carrasquillo); seven grandchildren, and three siblings.

References

1926 births
2008 deaths
20th-century American educators
American male violinists
American people of Czech descent
Polish emigrants to the United States
Musicians from Warsaw
People from Bloomfield, Connecticut
University of Hartford Hartt School faculty
20th-century American violinists
20th-century American male musicians